Attu is a 2017 Indian Tamil-language gangster film directed by Rathan Lingaa, who previously directed the short film Blood Revolution.  The film stars newcomers Rishi Ritwik and Archana Ravi.

Cast 
Rishi Ritwik as Attu
Archana Ravi as Sundari
Yogi Babu as Sappa
Prabha as Uluva
Dheena as Pulinathope Jaya
Rajasekhar as Das
Bala Singh in a guest appearance

Production 
Rishi Ritwik, who previously worked as a computer science engineer and athlete, interacted with gangsters for six months to prepare for his role in the film.

Release 
Chitra Deepa Anandram of The Hindu opined that "The manner in which debutant director Rathan Linga has perceived each and every scene in Attu, and the detailing that goes in in creating those scenes, tell a lot about his directorial brilliance". A critic from Samayam Tamil gave the film a rating of two out of five stars. A critic from The New Indian Express opined that "All said, Attu delivers far more than you’d have expected from a debutant filmmaker making a fairly anonymous film". Behindwoods noted that "On the whole, Attu is a life, rather than a film and has a decent story to back it up. It majorly deals with friendship, love, trust, gangsters and a lot of other entities that the characters coexist with". A critic from Maalai Malar gave the film a favourable review. A critic from iFlicks, on the contrary, called the film "watchable".

Notes

References

External links 

Indian gangster films